Ginger Huber is an American diver who won the silver medal at the 2013 World Aquatics Championships in Barcelona at the High diving event behind Cesilie Carlton and before Anna Bader.

References

Living people
American female divers
Female high divers
World Aquatics Championships medalists in high diving
Year of birth missing (living people)
21st-century American women